Argyroderma testiculare (Afrikaans: bokklootjies) is a species of succulents endemic to the quartz gravel of the Knersvlakte region. It belongs to the Aizoaceae family, and is listed as rare on the SANBI Red List, because it occurs in an area smaller than 68 km2, but it is not endangered there.

It is a small plant that does not grow larger than 15 cm. The leaves are thick and look like an egg which has been chopped in half. The flowers are purple with a yellow centre.

Conservation status 
Argyroderma testiculare has an EOO of 68 km2, thus giving it the classification of Rare. There are no severe threats to the species as most of its habitat is protected.

References 

Endemic flora of South Africa
Aizoaceae
Taxa named by N. E. Brown
Taxa named by William Aiton